El Capricho is a villa in Comillas (Cantabria), Spain, designed by Antoni Gaudí. It was built in 1883–1885 for the summer use of a wealthy client, Máximo Díaz de Quijano.  Unfortunately the client died a year before the house was completed.

Gaudí, who designed only a small number of buildings outside Catalonia, was involved with other projects at Comillas. He was the assistant of Joan Martorell on another summer residence, the palacio de Sobrellano.

El Capricho belongs to the architect's orientalist period, during the beginnings of Gaudi's artwork. El Capricho allows to see all the foundations on which Modernisme is based, anticipating Europe's avant-garde Art Nouveau. The tower has been compared to a minaret. After the death of Máximo Díaz de Quijano, this building was used such as a summer house for the most economically and politically powerful people.

The building fell into disrepair after the Spanish Civil War, a state in which it continued despite being declared a National Monument in 1969. In 1977, the last descendant of the López-Díaz de Quijano family sold the property and it was restored and turned into a restaurant in 1988. Finally, in 2009, the building became a museum.

References

External links

Folly buildings
Houses completed in 1885
Antoni Gaudí buildings
Bien de Interés Cultural landmarks in Cantabria
Houses in Spain
Museums in Cantabria